Ochyrocera aragogue is a species of spider of the family Ochyroceratidae. It is endemic to Brazil. It was named after the giant spider Aragog in Harry Potter and the Chamber of Secrets.  It was discovered in the Carajás National Forest in Pará, Brazil.

See also
 List of Ochyroceratidae species
 List of organisms named after the Harry Potter series

References

Ochyroceratidae
Spiders of Brazil
Endemic fauna of Brazil
Spiders described in 2018